Caprella linearis (linear skeleton shrimp) is a species of skeleton shrimp in the genus Caprella. It is native to the North Atlantic, North Pacific, and the Arctic Ocean. It closely resembles Caprella septentrionalis with which it shares the same geographical distribution.

Caprella linearis is the type species of the genus Caprella. It was first described by Carl Linnaeus in 1767 as "Cancer linearis".

See also
Caprella mutica

References

External links
Video of Caprella linearis males fighting
 

Corophiidea
Crustaceans described in 1767
Taxa named by Carl Linnaeus